The Queen Street Assembly of God is the commonly used name for the Auckland (NZ) Assembly of God during its heyday in the late 1970s and early 1980s when it was the largest church in Australasia.  Towards the end of the 1970s its building (510 Queens Street) proved too small and it moved to the town hall, and was often referred to as the Town Hall AoG

Origins
While this church had roots in the early days of the pentecostal revivals in New Zealand, real growth began around 1965 with the ministry of Bob and Noelle Midgley.

The 1970s
When the Midgleys left for further work overseas in December 1970, Neville Johnson became the new senior pastor. The work continued to experience growth seeing “amazing acts of healing and greatly increased attendances”

Growth occurred in all areas.  Missionary work flourished under the leadership of John Watson, with outposts in Asia, Africa and South America.  At one stage over 60% of the church income was spent on missions.  The church was known for vibrant music, producing some recordings of live worship.  Youth work flourished.  An effective Bible School the Zion Bible Training Centre was established.
  
People were attracted from all over Australasia to Neville's teaching.  He was a proponent of the “Covering” or “Submission” theology and totally opposed to divorce and remarriage.  Other teaching themes included victorious living and a strong emphasis on applications of the Old Testament.

The 1980s
Difficult times followed the resignation of Neville Johnson from the church on 27 April 1983.  The reasons given in a prepared public statement were 'misuse of office, and immoral, improper and deceitful conduct'.  Such was the ambiguity and lack of clarity of the situation that many continued to give to Neville for months to come believing he had done nothing wrong.  In the light of potential impact on the denomination as a whole, Jim Williams (the General Superintendent of the AoG at the time) wrote to every AoG pastor in the country.

Attendances fell from 2,500 to around 1000.  Income also fell.  Mission work was scaled back (with many workers finding other supporters) and the Zion Bible Training Centre had to close.  This from Clarke's history or the AoG in New Zealand:

The new senior pastor of the Auckland assembly was Kem Price.  With extraordinary focus and effort he managed to see the church through this challenging time to the completion of a new building.

New name
A financial rescue package saw the leadership of the church change and the church changed its name to the Victory Christian Centre.  Following on from Kem Price, Rick Seaward, an American Missionary from Singapore led the church from June 1988.  After his return to Singapore in 1994 the leadership was taken up by was Max Legg.  Subsequently, following a greater involvement with the Toronto Vineyard, he led the church out of the denomination in 2003.

Notes

References
Philip D. Carew Māori, Biculturalism and the Assemblies of God in New Zealand, 1970 - 2008  Thesis
Assemblies of God in New Zealand website
Ian G. Clark Pentecost at the Ends of the Earth: The History of the Assemblies of God in New Zealand (1927-2003)
Jonathan Harper, The Church that’s Taking Over Auckland Metro no. 29 (1983): 122-135

Assemblies of God churches